Stefan Jarosch (born 17 February 1984) is a German former professional footballer who played as a right-back. He is a former German U-20 international, made five appearances for SV Wacker Burghausen in the 2. Bundesliga and 78 for Jahn Regensburg in the 3. Liga during his playing career.

References

External links 
 
 

1984 births
Living people
People from Böblingen
Sportspeople from Stuttgart (region)
German footballers
Footballers from Baden-Württemberg
Association football defenders
Germany youth international footballers
2. Bundesliga players
3. Liga players
VfB Stuttgart II players
SV Wacker Burghausen players
SSV Jahn Regensburg players